The Pratyutpanna Samādhi Sūtra (Sanskrit; ; Vietnamese: Kinh Bát Chu Tam Muội) is an early Mahayana Buddhist scripture, which probably originated between the 1st century BCE and 2nd century CE in the Gandhara area of northwestern India. The full title for this text is Pratyutpannabuddha Saṃmukhāvasthita Samādhi Sūtra, which translates to, "Sūtra on the Samādhi for Encountering Face-to-Face the Buddhas of the Present".

History
The Pratyutpanna Samādhi Sūtra was first translated into Chinese by the Kushan Buddhist monk Lokaksema in 179 CE, at the Han capital of Luoyang. This translation is, together with the Prajnaparamita Sutra, one of the earliest historically datable texts of the Mahayana tradition.

In 2018, the discovery of fragments of a birch bark manuscript in the Gāndhārī language and written in Kharoṣṭhī script was announced by scholars Paul Harrison, Timothy Lenz, and Richard Salomon, who wrote regarding the dating of the manuscript:

The post-script of the same paper notes that as the article went to press, scholar Mark Allon brought to the authors' attention "another set of birch-bark fragments, possibly from the same scroll or set of scrolls, containing a large section of Chapter 9 of the PRaS,", which the authors state will be included in a follow-up article in the future.

Contents
The Pratyutpanna Samādhi Sūtra contains the first known mentions of the Buddha Amitābha and his pure land, said to be at the origin of Pure Land Buddhism in China:

Pratyutpanna samadhi

The full practice developed by Zhiyi is 90 days long.  Lay practitioners often take a much shorter time. Any practice that exceeds one day requires a bystander called a dharma protector (護法) to look after the practitioner. The exercise includes constant walking or praying to Amitabha, sometimes accompanying or helped by the bystander. The practitioner should avoid sitting, laying, resting or sleeping during the period of practice. The bystander would warn the practitioner if he or she engages in prolonged resting. Very few Buddhists practice this. Yinguang (印光) suggested that people should practice the much easier recitation of name of the Buddha nianfo instead.   But some buddhists have said that they feel healthier after the practice.

See also
 The Larger Sutra of Immeasurable Life
 The Contemplation Sutra
 Buddhist texts

References

Bibliography
 Harrison, Paul; McRae, John, trans. (1998). The Pratyutpanna Samādhi Sutra and the Śūraṅgama Samādhi Sutra , Berkeley, Calif.: Numata Center for Buddhist Translation and Research.  
 Harrison, PM (1979). The Pratyutpanna-buddha-sammukhavasthita-samadhi-sutra: an annotated English translation of the Tibetan version with several appendices, thesis, Australian National University
 Harrison, Paul (1978). Buddhanusmriti in the Pratyutpanna-Buddha-Sammukhavasthita-Samadhi-Sutra, Journal of Indian Philosophy 6 (1), 35-57 
 Harrison, Paul (1990). The Samādhi of Direct Encounter with the Buddhas of the Present: An Annotated English Translation of the Tibetan Version of the Pratyutpanna-Buddha-Saṃmukhāvasthita-Samādhi-Sūtra with Several Appendices Relating to the History of the Text, Studia Philologica Buddhica 5. Tokyo: The International Institute for Buddhist Studies

External links 

 Partial translation – Translation by Rev. Hisao Inagaki
 Complete translation – English Translation from the Chinese Canon

Mahayana texts
Yogacara